The Holocaust, also known as the Shoah, was the genocide of European Jews during World War II. Between 1941 and 1945, Nazi Germany and its collaborators systematically murdered some six million Jews across German-occupied Europe; around two-thirds of Europe's Jewish population. The murders were carried out in pogroms and mass shootings; by a policy of extermination through labor in concentration camps; and in gas chambers and gas vans in German extermination camps, chiefly Auschwitz-Birkenau, Bełżec, Chełmno, Majdanek, Sobibór, and Treblinka in occupied Poland.

Germany implemented the persecution in stages. Following Adolf Hitler's appointment as chancellor on 30 January 1933, the regime built a network of concentration camps in Germany for political opponents and those deemed "undesirable", starting with Dachau on 22 March 1933. After the passing of the Enabling Act on 24 March, which gave Hitler dictatorial plenary powers, the government began isolating Jews from civil society; this included boycotting Jewish businesses in April 1933 and enacting the Nuremberg Laws in September 1935. On 9–10 November 1938, eight months after Germany annexed Austria, Jewish businesses and other buildings were ransacked or set on fire throughout Germany and Austria on what became known as Kristallnacht (the "Night of Broken Glass"). After Germany invaded Poland in September 1939, triggering World War II, the regime set up ghettos to segregate Jews. Eventually, thousands of camps and other detention sites were established across German-occupied Europe.

The segregation of Jews in ghettos culminated in the policy of extermination the Nazis called the Final Solution to the Jewish Question, discussed by senior government officials at the Wannsee Conference in Berlin in January 1942. As German forces captured territories in the East, all anti-Jewish measures were radicalized. Under the coordination of the SS, with directions from the highest leadership of the Nazi Party, killings were committed within Germany itself, throughout occupied Europe, and within territories controlled by Germany's allies. Paramilitary death squads called Einsatzgruppen, in cooperation with the German Army and local collaborators, murdered around 1.3 million Jews in mass shootings and pogroms from the summer of 1941. By mid-1942, victims were being deported from ghettos across Europe in sealed freight trains to extermination camps where, if they survived the journey, they were gassed, worked or beaten to death, or killed by disease, starvation, cold, medical experiments, or during death marches. The killing continued until the end of World War II in Europe in May 1945.

The Holocaust is understood as being primarily the genocide of the Jews, but during the Holocaust era (1933–1945), systematic mass-killings of other population groups occurred. These included Roma, Poles, Ukrainians, Soviet civilians and prisoners of war, and other targeted populations. Smaller groups were also victims of deadly Nazi persecution, such as Jehovah's Witnesses, Black Germans, disabled people, communists, and homosexuals.

Terminology and scope

Terminology

The first recorded use of the term holocaust in its modern sense was made in 1895 by The New York Times to describe the massacre of Armenian Christians by Ottoman forces. The biblical term shoah, meaning "calamity" (and also used to refer to "destruction" since the Middle Ages), became the standard Hebrew term for the murder of the European Jews. According to Haaretz, the writer Yehuda Erez may have been the first to describe events in Germany as the shoah. Davar and later Haaretz both used the term in September 1939.

On 3 October 1941 the American Hebrew used the phrase "before the Holocaust", apparently to refer to the situation in France, and in May 1943 the New York Times, discussing the Bermuda Conference, referred to the "hundreds of thousands of European Jews still surviving the Nazi Holocaust". In 1968 the Library of Congress created a new category, "Holocaust, Jewish (1939–1945)".

The term was popularised in the United States by the NBC mini-series Holocaust (1978) about a fictional family of German Jews, and in November that year the President's Commission on the Holocaust was established. As non-Jewish groups began to include themselves as Holocaust victims, many Jews chose to use the Hebrew terms Shoah or Churban. The Nazis used the phrase "Final Solution to the Jewish Question".

Definition
Holocaust historians commonly define the Holocaust as the genocide of the European Jews by Nazi Germany and its collaborators between 1941 and 1945. Donald Niewyk and Francis Nicosia, in The Columbia Guide to the Holocaust (2000), favor a definition that includes the Jews, Roma, and disabled people: "the systematic, state-sponsored murder of entire groups determined by heredity".

Other groups targeted after Hitler became Chancellor of Germany in January 1933 include those whom the Nazis viewed as inherently inferior (some Slavic people, particularly Poles and Russians, the Roma, and the disabled), and those targeted because of their beliefs or behavior (such as Jehovah's Witnesses, communists, and homosexuals). Peter Hayes writes that the persecution of these groups was less uniform than that of the Jews. For example, the Nazis' treatment of the Slavs consisted of "enslavement and gradual attrition", while some Slavs were favored; Hayes lists Bulgarians, Croats, Slovaks, and some Ukrainians. In contrast, according to historian Dan Stone, Hitler regarded the Jews as "a Gegenrasse: a 'counter-race' ... not really human at all".

Distinctive features

Genocidal state

The logistics of the mass murder turned Germany into what Michael Berenbaum called a "genocidal state". Eberhard Jäckel wrote in 1986 that it was the first time a state had thrown its power behind the idea that an entire people should be wiped out. In total, 165,200 German Jews were murdered. Anyone with three or four Jewish grandparents was to be exterminated, and complex rules were devised to deal with Mischlinge ("mixed breeds"). Bureaucrats identified who was a Jew, confiscated property, and scheduled trains to deport them. Companies fired Jews and later used them as slave labor. Universities dismissed Jewish faculty and students. German pharmaceutical companies tested drugs on camp prisoners; other companies built the crematoria. As prisoners entered the death camps, they surrendered all personal property, which was cataloged and tagged before being sent to Germany for reuse or recycling. Through a concealed account, the German National Bank helped launder valuables stolen from the victims.

Medical experiments

At least 7,000 camp inmates were subjected to medical experiments; most died during them or as a result. The experiments, which took place at Auschwitz, Buchenwald, Dachau, Natzweiler-Struthof, Neuengamme, Ravensbrück, and Sachsenhausen, sought to uncover strategies to counteract chemical weapons, survive harsh environments, develop new vaccines and drugs and treat wounds. Many men and women were also involuntarily sterilized.

After the war, 23 senior physicians and other medical personnel were charged at Nuremberg with crimes against humanity. They included the head of the German Red Cross, tenured professors, clinic directors, and biomedical researchers. The most notorious physician was Josef Mengele, an SS officer who became the Auschwitz camp doctor on 30 May 1943. Interested in genetics, and keen to experiment on twins, he would pick out subjects on the ramp from the new arrivals during "selection" (to decide who would be gassed immediately and who would be used as slave labor), shouting "Zwillinge heraus!" (twins step forward!). The twins would be measured, killed, and dissected. One of Mengele's assistants said in 1946 that he was told to send organs of interest to the directors of the "Anthropological Institute in Berlin-Dahlem". This is thought to refer to Mengele's academic supervisor, Otmar Freiherr von Verschuer, director from October 1942 of the Kaiser Wilhelm Institute of Anthropology, Human Heredity, and Eugenics in Berlin-Dahlem.

Origins

Antisemitism and the völkisch movement

Throughout the Middle Ages in Europe, Jews were subjected to antisemitism based on Christian theology, which blamed them for killing Jesus. Even after the Reformation, Catholicism and Lutheranism continued to persecute Jews, accusing them of blood libels and subjecting them to pogroms and expulsions. The second half of the 19th century saw the emergence, in the German empire and Austria-Hungary, of the völkisch movement, developed by such thinkers as Houston Stewart Chamberlain and Paul de Lagarde. The movement embraced a pseudo-scientific racism that viewed Jews as a race whose members were locked in mortal combat with the Aryan race for world domination. These ideas became commonplace throughout Germany; the professional classes adopted an ideology that did not see humans as racial equals with equal hereditary value. The Nazi Party (the Nationalsozialistische Deutsche Arbeiterpartei or National Socialist German Workers' Party) originated as an offshoot of the völkisch movement, and it adopted that movement's antisemitism.

Germany after World War I, Hitler's world view

After World War I (1914–1918), many Germans did not accept that their country had been defeated. A stab-in-the-back myth developed, insinuating that disloyal politicians, chiefly Jews and communists, had orchestrated Germany's surrender. Inflaming the anti-Jewish sentiment was the apparent over-representation of Jews in the leadership of communist revolutionary governments in Europe, such as Ernst Toller, head of a short-lived revolutionary government in Bavaria. This perception contributed to the canard of Jewish Bolshevism.

Early antisemites in the Nazi Party included Dietrich Eckart, publisher of the Völkischer Beobachter, the party's newspaper, and Alfred Rosenberg, who wrote antisemitic articles for it in the 1920s. Rosenberg's vision of a secretive Jewish conspiracy ruling the world would influence Hitler's views of Jews by making them the driving force behind communism.  Central to Hitler's world view was the idea of expansion and Lebensraum (living space) in Eastern Europe for German Aryans, a policy of what Doris Bergen called "race and space". Open about his hatred of Jews, he subscribed to common antisemitic stereotypes. From the early 1920s onwards, he compared the Jews to germs and said they should be dealt with in the same way. He viewed Marxism as a Jewish doctrine, said he was fighting against "Jewish Marxism", and believed that Jews had created communism as part of a conspiracy to destroy Germany.

Rise of Nazi Germany

Dictatorship and repression (January 1933)

With the appointment in January 1933 of Adolf Hitler as Chancellor of Germany and the Nazi's seizure of power, German leaders proclaimed the rebirth of the Volksgemeinschaft ("people's community"). Nazi policies divided the population into two groups: the Volksgenossen ("national comrades") who belonged to the Volksgemeinschaft, and the Gemeinschaftsfremde ("community aliens") who did not. Enemies were divided into three groups: the "racial" or "blood" enemies, such as the Jews and Roma; political opponents of Nazism, such as Marxists, liberals, Christians, and the "reactionaries" viewed as wayward "national comrades"; and moral opponents, such as gay men, the work-shy, and habitual criminals. The latter two groups were to be sent to concentration camps for "re-education", with the aim of eventual absorption into the Volksgemeinschaft. "Racial" enemies could never belong to the Volksgemeinschaft; they were to be removed from society.

Before and after the March 1933 Reichstag elections, the Nazis intensified their campaign of violence against opponents, setting up concentration camps for extrajudicial imprisonment. One of the first, at Dachau, opened on 22 March 1933. Initially the camp contained mostly Communists and Social Democrats. Other early prisons were consolidated by mid-1934 into purpose-built camps outside the cities, run exclusively by the SS. The camps served as a deterrent by terrorizing Germans who did not support the regime.

Throughout the 1930s, the legal, economic, and social rights of Jews were steadily restricted. On 1 April 1933, there was a boycott of Jewish businesses. On 7 April 1933, the Law for the Restoration of the Professional Civil Service was passed, which excluded Jews and other "non-Aryans" from the civil service. Jews were disbarred from practicing law, being editors or proprietors of newspapers, joining the Journalists' Association, or owning farms. In Silesia, in March 1933, a group of men entered the courthouse and beat up Jewish lawyers; Friedländer writes that, in Dresden, Jewish lawyers and judges were dragged out of courtrooms during trials. Jewish students were restricted by quotas from attending schools and universities. Jewish businesses were targeted for closure or "Aryanization", the forcible sale to Germans; of the approximately 50,000 Jewish-owned businesses in Germany in 1933, about 7,000 were still Jewish-owned in April 1939. Works by Jewish composers, authors, and artists were excluded from publications, performances, and exhibitions. Jewish doctors were dismissed or urged to resign. The Deutsches Ärzteblatt (a medical journal) reported on 6 April 1933: "Germans are to be treated by Germans only."

Sterilization Law, Aktion T4

The economic strain of the Great Depression led Protestant charities and some members of the German medical establishment to advocate compulsory sterilization of the "incurable" mentally and physically disabled, people the Nazis called Lebensunwertes Leben (life unworthy of life). On 14 July 1933, the Law for the Prevention of Hereditarily Diseased Offspring (Gesetz zur Verhütung erbkranken Nachwuchses), the Sterilization Law, was passed. The New York Times reported on 21 December that year: "400,000 Germans to be sterilized". There were 84,525 applications from doctors in the first year. The courts reached a decision in 64,499 of those cases; 56,244 were in favor of sterilization. Estimates for the number of involuntary sterilizations during the whole of the Third Reich range from 300,000 to 400,000.

In October 1939 Hitler signed a "euthanasia decree" backdated to 1 September 1939 that authorized Reichsleiter Philipp Bouhler, the chief of Hitler's Chancellery, and Karl Brandt, Hitler's personal physician, to carry out a program of involuntary euthanasia. After the war this program came to be known as Aktion T4, named after Tiergartenstraße 4, the address of a villa in the Berlin borough of Tiergarten, where the various organizations involved were headquartered. T4 was mainly directed at adults, but the euthanasia of children was also carried out. Between 1939 and 1941, 80,000 to 100,000 mentally ill adults in institutions were killed, as were 5,000 children and 1,000 Jews, also in institutions. There were also dedicated killing centers, where the deaths were estimated at 20,000, according to Georg Renno, deputy director of Schloss Hartheim, one of the euthanasia centers, or 400,000, according to Frank Zeireis, commandant of the Mauthausen concentration camp. Overall, the number of mentally and physically disabled people murdered was about 150,000.

Although not ordered to take part, psychiatrists and many psychiatric institutions were involved in the planning and carrying out of Aktion T4. In August 1941, after protests from Germany's Catholic and Protestant churches, Hitler canceled the T4 program, although disabled people continued to be killed until the end of the war. The medical community regularly received bodies for research; for example, the University of Tübingen received 1,077 bodies from executions between 1933 and 1945. The German neuroscientist Julius Hallervorden received 697 brains from one hospital between 1940 and 1944: "I accepted these brains of course. Where they came from and how they came to me was really none of my business."

Nuremberg Laws, Jewish emigration

On 15 September 1935, the Reichstag passed the Reich Citizenship Law and the Law for the Protection of German Blood and German Honor, known as the Nuremberg Laws. The former said that only those of "German or kindred blood" could be citizens. Anyone with three or more Jewish grandparents was classified as a Jew. The second law said: "Marriages between Jews and subjects of the state of German or related blood are forbidden." Sexual relationships between them were also criminalized; Jews were not allowed to employ German women under the age of 45 in their homes. The laws referred to Jews but applied equally to the Roma and black Germans. Although other European countries—Bulgaria, Independent State of Croatia, Hungary, Italy, Romania, Slovakia, and Vichy France—passed similar legislation, Gerlach notes that "Nazi Germany adopted more nationwide anti-Jewish laws and regulations (about 1,500) than any other state."

By the end of 1934, 50,000 German Jews had left Germany, and by the end of 1938, approximately half the German Jewish population had left, among them the conductor Bruno Walter, who fled after being told that the hall of the Berlin Philharmonic would be burned down if he conducted a concert there. Albert Einstein, who was in the United States when Hitler came to power, never returned to Germany; his citizenship was revoked and he was expelled from the Kaiser Wilhelm Society and Prussian Academy of Sciences. Other Jewish scientists, including Gustav Hertz, lost their teaching positions and left the country.

Anschluss (12 March 1938)

On 12 March 1938, Germany annexed Austria. Ninety percent of Austria's 176,000 Jews lived in Vienna. The SS and SA smashed shops and stole cars belonging to Jews; Austrian police stood by, some already wearing swastika armbands. Jews were forced to perform humiliating acts such as scrubbing the streets or cleaning toilets while wearing tefillin. Around 7,000 Jewish businesses were "Aryanized", and all the legal restrictions on Jews in Germany were imposed in Austria. The Évian Conference was held in France in July 1938 by 32 countries, to help German and Austrian Jewish refugees, but little was accomplished and most countries did not increase the number of refugees they would accept. In August that year, Adolf Eichmann was appointed manager (under Franz Walter Stahlecker) of the Central Agency for Jewish Emigration in Vienna (Zentralstelle für jüdische Auswanderung in Wien). Sigmund Freud and his family arrived in London from Vienna in June 1938, thanks to what David Cesarani called "Herculean efforts" to get them out.

Kristallnacht (9–10 November 1938)

On 7 November 1938, Herschel Grynszpan, a Polish Jew, shot the German diplomat Ernst vom Rath in the German Embassy in Paris, in retaliation for the expulsion of his parents and siblings from Germany. When vom Rath died on 9 November, the synagogue and Jewish shops in Dessau were attacked. According to Joseph Goebbels' diary, Hitler decided that the police should be withdrawn: "For once the Jews should feel the rage of the people," Goebbels reported him as saying. The result, David Cesarani writes, was "murder, rape, looting, destruction of property, and terror on an unprecedented scale".

Known as Kristallnacht ("Night of Broken Glass"), the pogrom on 9–10 November 1938 saw over 7,500 Jewish shops (out of 9,000) looted and attacked, and over 1,000 synagogues damaged or destroyed. Groups of Jews were forced by the crowd to watch their synagogues burn; in Bensheim they were made to dance around it and in Laupheim to kneel before it. At least 90 Jews were murdered. The damage was estimated at 39 million Reichsmark. Contrary to Goebbel's statements in his diary, the police were not withdrawn; the regular police, Gestapo, SS and SA all took part, although Heinrich Himmler was angry that the SS had joined in. Attacks took place in Austria too. The extent of the violence shocked the rest of the world. The Times of London stated on 11 November 1938:

Between 9 and 16 November, 30,000 Jews were sent to the Buchenwald, Dachau, and Sachsenhausen concentration camps. Many were released within weeks; by early 1939, 2,000 remained in the camps. German Jewry was held collectively responsible for restitution of the damage; they also had to pay an "atonement tax" of over a billion Reichsmark. Insurance payments for damage to their property were confiscated by the government. A decree on 12 November 1938 barred Jews from most remaining occupations. Kristallnacht marked the end of any sort of public Jewish activity and culture, and Jews stepped up their efforts to leave the country.

Resettlement

Before World War II, Germany considered mass deportation from Europe of German, and later European, Jewry. Among the areas considered for possible resettlement were British Palestine and, after the war began, French Madagascar, Siberia, and two reservations in Poland. Palestine was the only location to which any German resettlement plan produced results, via the Haavara Agreement between the Zionist Federation of Germany and the German government. Between November 1933 and December 1939, the agreement resulted in the emigration of about 53,000 German Jews, who were allowed to transfer RM 100 million of their assets to Palestine by buying German goods, in violation of the Jewish-led anti-Nazi boycott of 1933.

Outbreak of World War II

Invasion of Poland (1 September 1939)

Ghettos

Between 2.7 and 3 million Polish Jews were murdered during the Holocaust, out of a population of 3.3 – 3.5 million. More Jews lived in Poland in 1939 than anywhere else in Europe; another 3 million lived in the Soviet Union. When the German Wehrmacht (armed forces) invaded Poland on 1 September 1939, triggering declarations of war from the UK and France, Germany gained control of about two million Jews in the territory it occupied. The rest of Poland was occupied by the Soviet Union, which invaded Poland from the east on 17 September 1939.

The Wehrmacht in Poland was accompanied by seven SS Einsatzgruppen der Sicherheitspolitizei ("special task forces of the Security Police") and an Einsatzkommando, numbering 3,000 men in all, whose role was to deal with "all anti-German elements in hostile country behind the troops in combat". German plans for Poland included expelling non-Jewish Poles from large areas, settling Germans on the emptied lands, sending the Polish leadership to camps, denying the lower classes an education, and confining Jews. The Germans sent Jews from all territories they had annexed (Austria, the Czech lands, and western Poland) to the central section of Poland, which was termed the General Government. Jews were eventually to be expelled to areas of Poland not annexed by Germany. Still, in the meantime, they would be concentrated in major cities ghettos to achieve, according to an order from Reinhard Heydrich dated 21 September 1939, "a better possibility of control and later deportation". From 1 December, Jews were required to wear Star of David armbands.

The Germans stipulated that each ghetto be led by a Judenrat of 24 male Jews, who would be responsible for carrying out German orders. These orders included, from 1942, facilitating deportations to extermination camps. The Warsaw Ghetto was established in November 1940, and by early 1941 it contained 445,000 people; the second largest, the Łódź Ghetto, held 160,000 as of May 1940. The inhabitants had to pay for food and other supplies by selling whatever goods they could produce. In the ghettos and forced-labor camps, at least half a million died of starvation, disease, and poor living conditions. Although the Warsaw Ghetto contained 30 percent of the city's population, it occupied only 2.4 percent of its area, averaging over nine people per room. Over 43,000 residents died there in 1941.

Pogroms in occupied eastern Poland

Peter Hayes writes that the Germans created a "Hobbesian world" in Poland in which different parts of the population were pitted against each other. A perception among ethnic Poles that the Jews had supported the Soviet invasion contributed to existing antisemitism, which Germany exploited, redistributing Jewish homes and goods, and converting synagogues, schools and hospitals in Jewish areas into facilities for non-Jews. The Germans ordered the death penalty for anyone helping Jews. Informants pointed out who was Jewish and the Poles who were helping to hide them during the Judenjagd (hunt for the Jews). Despite the dangers, thousands of Poles helped Jews. Nearly 1,000 were executed for having done so, and Yad Vashem has named over 7,000 Poles as Righteous Among the Nations.

Pogroms occurred throughout the occupation. During the Lviv pogroms in Lwów, occupied eastern Poland (later Lviv, Ukraine) in June and July 1941—the population was 157,490 Polish; 99,595 Jewish; and 49,747 Ukrainian—some 6,000 Jews were murdered in the streets by the Ukrainian nationalists (specifically, the OUN) and Ukrainian People's Militia, aided by local people. Jewish women were stripped, beaten, and raped. Also, after the arrival of Einsatzgruppe C units on 2 July, another 3,000 Jews were killed in mass shootings carried out by the German SS. During the Jedwabne pogrom, on 10 July 1941, a group of 40 Polish men, spurred on by German Gestapo agents who arrived in the town a day earlier, killed several hundred Jews; around 300 were burned alive in a barn. According to Hayes, this was "one of sixty-six nearly simultaneous such attacks in the province of Suwałki alone and some two hundred similar incidents in the Soviet-annexed eastern provinces".

German Nazi Extermination camps in Poland

At the end of 1941, the Germans began building extermination camps in Poland: Auschwitz II, Bełżec, Chełmno, Majdanek, Sobibór, and Treblinka. Gas chambers had been installed by the spring or summer of 1942. The SS liquidated most of the ghettos of the General Government area in 1942–1943 (the Łódź Ghetto was liquidated in mid-1944), and shipped their populations to these camps, along with Jews from all over Europe. The camps provided locals with employment and with black-market goods confiscated from Jewish families who, thinking they were being resettled, arrived with their belongings. According to Hayes, dealers in currency and jewellery set up shop outside the Treblinka extermination camp (near Warsaw) in 1942–1943, as did prostitutes. By the end of 1942, most of the Jews in the General Government area were dead. The Jewish death toll in the extermination camps was over three million overall; most Jews were gassed on arrival.

Invasion of Norway and Denmark

Germany invaded Norway and Denmark on 9 April 1940, during Operation Weserübung. Denmark was overrun so quickly that there was no time for a resistance to form. Consequently, the Danish government stayed in power and the Germans found it easier to work through it. Because of this, few measures were taken against the Danish Jews before 1942. By June 1940 Norway was completely occupied. In late 1940, the country's 1,800 Jews were banned from certain occupations, and in 1941 all Jews had to register their property with the government. On 26 November 1942, 532 Jews were taken by police officers, at four o'clock in the morning, to Oslo harbor, where they boarded a German ship. From Germany they were sent by freight train to Auschwitz. According to Dan Stone, only nine survived the war.

Invasion of France and the Low Countries

In May 1940, Germany invaded the Netherlands, Luxembourg, Belgium, and France. After Belgium's surrender, the country was ruled by a German military governor, Alexander von Falkenhausen, who enacted anti-Jewish measures against its 90,000 Jews, many of them refugees from Germany or Eastern Europe. In the Netherlands, the Germans installed Arthur Seyss-Inquart as Reichskommissar, who began to persecute the country's 140,000 Jews. Jews were forced out of their jobs and had to register with the government. In February 1941, non-Jewish Dutch citizens staged a strike in protest that was quickly crushed. From July 1942, over 107,000 Dutch Jews were deported; only 5,000 survived the war. Most were sent to Auschwitz; the first transport of 1,135 Jews left Holland for Auschwitz on 15 July 1942. Between 2 March and 20 July 1943, 34,313 Jews were sent in 19 transports to the Sobibór extermination camp, where all but 18 are thought to have been gassed on arrival.

France had approximately 330,000 Jews, divided between the German-occupied north and the unoccupied collaborationist southern areas in Vichy France (named after the town Vichy), more than half this Jewish population were not French citizens, but refugees who had fled Nazi persecution in other countries. The occupied regions were under the control of a military governor, and there, anti-Jewish measures were not enacted as quickly as they were in the Vichy-controlled areas. In July 1940, the Jews in the parts of Alsace-Lorraine that had been annexed to Germany were expelled into Vichy France. Vichy France's government implemented anti-Jewish measures in Metropolitan France, in French Algeria and in the two French Protectorates of Tunisia and Morocco. Tunisia had 85,000 Jews when the Germans and Italians arrived in November 1942; an estimated 5,000 Jews were subjected to forced labor. The United States Holocaust Memorial Museum estimates that between 72,900 and 74,000 Jews were murdered during the Holocaust in France.

Madagascar Plan

The fall of France gave rise to the Madagascar Plan in the summer of 1940, when French Madagascar in Southeast Africa became the focus of discussions about deporting all European Jews there; it was thought that the area's harsh living conditions would hasten deaths. Several Polish, French and British leaders had discussed the idea in the 1930s, as did German leaders from 1938. Adolf Eichmann's office was ordered to investigate the option, but no evidence of planning exists until after the defeat of France in June 1940. Germany's inability to defeat Britain, something that was obvious to the Germans by September 1940, prevented the movement of Jews across the seas, and the Foreign Ministry abandoned the plan in February 1942.

Invasion of Yugoslavia and Greece

Yugoslavia and Greece were invaded in April 1941 and surrendered before the end of the month. Germany, Italy and Bulgaria divided Greece into occupation zones but did not eliminate it as a country. The pre-war Greek Jewish population had been between 72,000 and 77,000. By the end of the war, some 10,000 remained, representing the lowest survival rate in the Balkans and among the lowest in Europe.

Yugoslavia, home to 80,000 Jews, was dismembered; regions in the north were annexed by Germany and Hungary, regions along the coast were made part of Italy, Kosovo and western Macedonia were given to Albania, while Bulgaria received eastern Macedonia. The rest of the country was divided into the Independent State of Croatia (NDH), an Italian-German puppet state whose territory comprised Croatia and Bosnia-Herzegovina, with the Croatian fascist Ustaše party placed in power; and German occupied Serbia, governed by German military and police administrators who appointed the Serbian collaborationist puppet government, Government of National Salvation, headed by Milan Nedić. In August 1942 Serbia was declared free of Jews, after the Wehrmacht and German police, assisted by collaborators of the Nedić government and others such as Zbor, a pro-Nazi and pan-Serbian fascist party, had murdered nearly the entire population of 17,000 Jews.

In the Independent State of Croatia (NDH), the Nazi regime demanded that its rulers, the Ustaše, adopt antisemitic racial policies, persecute Jews and set up several concentration camps. NDH leader Ante Pavelić and the Ustaše accepted Nazi demands. By the end of April 1941 the Ustaše required all Jews to wear insignia, typically a yellow Star of David and started confiscating Jewish property in October 1941. During the same time as their persecution of Serbs and Roma, the Ustaše took part in the Holocaust, and killed the majority of the country's Jews; the United States Holocaust Memorial Museum estimates that 30,148 Jews were murdered.  According to Jozo Tomasevich, the Jewish community in Zagreb was the only one to survive out of 115 Jewish religious communities in Yugoslavia in 1939–1940.

The state broke away from Nazi antisemitic policy by promising honorary Aryan citizenship, and thus freedom from persecution, to Jews who were willing to contribute to the "Croat cause". Marcus Tanner states that the "SS complained that at least 5,000 Jews were still alive in the NDH and that thousands of others had emigrated, by buying 'honorary Aryan' status". Nevenko Bartulin, however posits that of the total Jewish population of the NDH, only 100 Jews attained the legal status of Aryan citizens, 500 including their families. In both cases a relatively small portion out of a Jewish population of 37,000.

In the Bulgarian annexed zones of Macedonia and Thrace, upon demand of the German authorities, the Bulgarians handed over the entire Jewish population, about 12,000 Jews to the military authorities, all were deported.

Invasion of the Soviet Union (22 June 1941)

Reasons

Germany invaded the Soviet Union on 22 June 1941, a day Timothy Snyder called "one of the most significant days in the history of Europe ... the beginning of a calamity that defies description".  German propaganda portrayed the conflict as an ideological war between German National Socialism and Jewish Bolshevism, and as a racial war between the Germans and the Jewish, Romani, and Slavic Untermenschen ("sub-humans"). The war was driven by the need for resources, including, according to David Cesarani, agricultural land to feed Germany, natural resources for German industry, and control over Europe's largest oil fields.

Between early fall 1941 and late spring 1942, Jürgen Matthäus writes, 2 million of the 3.5 million Soviet POWs captured by the Wehrmacht had been executed or had died of neglect and abuse. By 1944 the Soviet death toll was at least 20 million.

Mass shootings

As the method of widespread execution was shooting rather than gas chamber, the Holocaust in the Soviet Union is sometimes referred to as the Holocaust by bullets.

As German troops advanced, the mass shooting of "anti-German elements" was assigned, as in Poland, to the Einsatzgruppen, this time under the command of Reinhard Heydrich. The point of the attacks was to destroy the local Communist Party leadership and therefore the state, including "Jews in the Party and State employment", and any "radical elements". Cesarani writes that the killing of Jews was at this point a "subset" of these activities.

Typically, victims would undress and give up their valuables before lining up beside a ditch to be shot, or they would be forced to climb into the ditch, lie on a lower layer of corpses, and wait to be killed. The latter was known as Sardinenpackung ("packing sardines"), a method reportedly started by SS officer Friedrich Jeckeln.

According to Wolfram Wette, the German army took part in these shootings as bystanders, photographers, and active shooters. In Lithuania, Latvia and western Ukraine, locals were deeply involved; Latvian and Lithuanian units participated in the murder of Jews in Belarus, and in the south, Ukrainians killed about 24,000 Jews. Some Ukrainians went to Poland to serve as guards in the camps.

Einsatzgruppe A arrived in the Baltic states (Estonia, Latvia, and Lithuania) with Army Group North; Einsatzgruppe B in Belarus with Army Group Center; Einsatzgruppe C in Ukraine with Army Group South; and Einsatzgruppe D went further south into Ukraine with the 11th Army. Each Einsatzgruppe numbered around 600–1,000 men, with a few women in administrative roles. Traveling with nine German Order Police battalions and three units of the Waffen-SS, the Einsatzgruppen and their local collaborators had murdered almost 500,000 people by the winter of 1941–1942. By the end of the war, they had killed around two million, including about 1.3 million Jews and up to a quarter of a million Roma.

Notable massacres include the July 1941 Ponary massacre near Vilnius (Soviet Lithuania), in which Einsatgruppe B and Lithuanian collaborators shot at least 70,000 Jews, 20,000  Poles and 8,000 Russians. In the Kamianets-Podilskyi massacre (Soviet Ukraine), nearly 24,000 Jews were killed between 27 and 30 August 1941. The largest massacre was at a ravine called Babi Yar outside Kiev (also Soviet Ukraine), where 33,771 Jews were killed on 29–30 September 1941. The Germans used the ravine for mass killings throughout the war; up to 100,000 may have been killed there.

Toward the Holocaust

At first the Einsatzgruppen targeted the male Jewish intelligentsia, defined as male Jews aged 15–60 who had worked for the state and in certain professions. The commandos described them as "Bolshevist functionaries" and similar. From August 1941 they began to murder women and children too. Christopher Browning reports that on 1 August 1941, the SS Cavalry Brigade passed an order to its units: "Explicit order by RF-SS [Heinrich Himmler, Reichsführer-SS]. All Jews must be shot. Drive the female Jews into the swamps."

Two years later, in a speech on 6 October 1943 to party leaders, Heinrich Himmler said he had ordered that women and children be shot, but according to Peter Longerich and Christian Gerlach, the murder of women and children began at different times in different areas, suggesting local influence.

Historians agree that there was a "gradual radicalization" between the spring and autumn of 1941 of what Longerich calls Germany's Judenpolitik, but they disagree about whether a decision—Führerentscheidung (Führer's decision)—to murder the European Jews had been made at this point. According to Browning, writing in 2004, most historians say there was no order, before the invasion of the Soviet Union, to kill all the Soviet Jews. Longerich wrote in 2010 that the gradual increase in brutality and numbers killed between July and September 1941 suggests there was "no particular order". Instead, it was a question of "a process of increasingly radical interpretations of orders".

Concentration and labor camps

Germany first used concentration camps as places of terror and unlawful incarceration of political opponents. Large numbers of Jews were not sent there until after Kristallnacht in November 1938. After war broke out in 1939, new camps were established, many outside Germany in occupied Europe. Most wartime prisoners of the camps were not Germans but belonged to countries under German occupation.

After 1942, the economic function of the camps, previously secondary to their penal and terror functions, came to the fore. Forced labor of camp prisoners became commonplace. The guards became much more brutal, and the death rate increased as the guards not only beat and starved prisoners but killed them more frequently. Vernichtung durch Arbeit ("extermination through labor") was a policy; camp inmates would literally be worked to death, or to physical exhaustion, at which point they would be gassed or shot. The Germans estimated the average prisoner's lifespan in a concentration camp at three months, as a result of lack of food and clothing, constant epidemics, and frequent punishments for the most minor transgressions. The shifts were long and often involved exposure to dangerous materials.

Transportation to and between camps was often carried out in closed freight cars with little air or water, long delays and prisoners packed tightly. In mid-1942 work camps began requiring newly arrived prisoners to be placed in quarantine for four weeks. Prisoners wore colored triangles on their uniforms, the color denoting the reason for their incarceration. Red signified a political prisoner, Jehovah's Witnesses had purple triangles, "asocials" and criminals wore black and green, and gay men wore pink. Jews wore two yellow triangles, one over another to form a six-pointed star. Prisoners in Auschwitz were tattooed on arrival with an identification number.

Germany's allies
The allies of Nazi Germany comprise the independent states that aligned themselves with the Reich. These countries were not necessarily signatories of the Tripartite Pact (Finland) and signatories of the Tripartite Pact were not necessarily allies of Germany (Slovakia and Croatia were puppet states). Thus, the 5 German allies in Europe were: Romania, Bulgaria, Hungary, Italy and Finland. All of these countries were under no formal German occupation and maintained complete domestic administrations.

Holocaust victims of Germany's allies

Romania

Romania ranks first among Holocaust perpetrator countries other than Germany. Romanian antisemitic legislation was not an attempt to placate the Germans, but rather entirely home-grown, preceding German hegemony and Nazi Germany itself. The ascendance of Germany enabled Romania to disregard the minorities treaties that were imposed upon the country after the First World War. Antisemitic legislation in Romania was usually aimed at exploiting Jews rather than humiliating them as in Germany.

At the end of 1937, the government of Octavian Goga came to power, Romania thus becoming the second overtly antisemitic state in Europe. Romania was the second country in Europe after Germany to enact antisemitic legislation, and the only one besides Germany to do so before the 1938 Anschluss. Romania was the only country other than Germany itself that "implemented all the steps of the destruction process, from definitions to killings." 

According to Dan Stone, the murder of Jews in Romania was "essentially an independent undertaking". Although Jewish persecution was unsystematic within the pre-war borders of Romania, it was systematic in the Romanian occupied territories of the Soviet Union. Romania implemented anti-Jewish measures in May and June 1940 as part of its efforts towards an alliance with Germany. By March 1941 all Jews had lost their jobs and had their property confiscated. In June 1941 Romania joined Germany in its invasion of the Soviet Union and within the first few weeks of the invasion, almost the entire rural Jewish population of Bessarabia and Bukovina were decimated.  

Thousands of Jews were murdered in January and June 1941 in the Bucharest and Iași pogroms. According to a 2004 report by Tuvia Friling and others, up to 14,850 Jews were murdered during the Iași pogrom. The Romanian military murdered up to 25,000 Jews during the Odessa massacre between 18 October 1941 and March 1942, assisted by gendarmes and the police. Within the city of Odessa, Jews were segregated to ghettos where they were later deported en masse, with the majority dying from disease, hunger and murder. In July 1941, Mihai Antonescu, Romania's deputy prime minister, said it was time for "total ethnic purification, for a revision of national life, and for purging our race of all those elements which are foreign to its soul, which have grown like mistletoes and darken our future." Romania set up concentration camps in Transnistria, reportedly extremely brutal, where 154,000–170,000 Jews were deported from 1941 to 1943. In the Odessa and Pervomaisk regions alone, Romanian authorities were responsible for the death of over 150,000 Jews.

Bulgaria, Hungary, Italy and Finland

Bulgaria introduced anti-Jewish measures between 1940 and 1943 (requirement to wear a yellow star, restrictions on owning telephones or radios, and so on). It annexed Thrace and Macedonia, and in February 1943 agreed to a demand from Germany that it deport 20,000 Jews to the Treblinka extermination camp. All 11,000 Jews from the annexed territories were sent to be murdered, and plans were made to deport 6,000–8,000 Bulgarian Jews from Sofia to meet the quota. When this became public, the Orthodox Church and many Bulgarians protested, and King Boris III canceled the plans. Instead, Jews native to Bulgaria were sent to the provinces.

Although Hungary expelled Jews who were not citizens from its newly annexed lands in 1941, it did not deport most of its Jews until the German invasion of Hungary in March 1944. Between 15 May and early July 1944, 437,000 Jews were deported, mostly to Auschwitz, where most of them were murdered by gas; there were four transports a day, each carrying 3,000 people. In Budapest in October and November 1944, the Hungarian Arrow Cross forced 50,000 Jews to march to the Austrian border as part of a deal with Germany to supply forced labor. So many died that the marches were stopped.

Italy introduced antisemitic measures, but there was less antisemitism there than in Germany, and Italian-occupied countries were generally safer for Jews than those occupied by Germany. Most Italian Jews, over 40,000, survived the Holocaust. In September 1943, Germany occupied the northern and central areas of Italy and established a fascist puppet state, the Italian Social Republic or Salò Republic. Officers from RSHA IV B4, a Gestapo unit, began deporting Jews to Auschwitz-Birkenau. The first group of 1,034 Jews arrived from Rome on 23 October 1943; 839 were murdered by gas. Around 8,500 Jews were deported in all. Several forced labor camps for Jews were established in Italian-controlled Libya; almost 2,600 Libyan Jews were sent to camps, where 562 were murdered.

In Finland, the government was pressured in 1942 to hand over its 150–200 non-Finnish Jews to Germany. After opposition from both the government and public, eight non-Finnish Jews were deported in late 1942; only one survived the war.

Other

Slovakia (German client)

Stone writes that Slovakia, led by Roman Catholic priest Jozef Tiso (president of the Slovak State, 1939–1945), was "one of the most loyal of the collaborationist regimes". It deported 7,500 Jews in 1938 on its own initiative; introduced anti-Jewish measures in 1940; and by the autumn of 1942 had deported around 60,000 Jews to Poland. Another 2,396 were deported and 2,257 killed that autumn during an uprising, and 13,500 were deported between October 1944 and March 1945. According to Stone, "the Holocaust in Slovakia was far more than a German project, even if it was carried out in the context of a 'puppet' state."

Japan

Japan had little antisemitism in its society and did not persecute Jews in most of the territories it controlled. Jews in Shanghai were confined, but despite German pressure they were not killed.

Final Solution

Pearl Harbor, Germany declares war on the United States

On 7 December 1941, Japanese aircraft attacked Pearl Harbor, an American naval base in Honolulu, Hawaii, killing 2,403 Americans. The following day, the United States declared war on Japan, and on 11 December, Germany declared war on the United States. According to Deborah Dwork and Robert Jan van Pelt, Hitler had trusted American Jews, whom he assumed were all-powerful, to keep the United States out of the war in the interests of German Jews. When America declared war, he blamed the Jews.

Nearly three years earlier, on 30 January 1939, Hitler had told the Reichstag: "if the international Jewish financiers in and outside Europe should succeed in plunging the nations once more into a world war, then the result will be not the Bolshevising of the earth, and thus a victory of Jewry, but the annihilation of the Jewish race in Europe!" In the view of Christian Gerlach, Hitler "announced his decision in principle" to annihilate the Jews on or around 12 December 1941, one day after his declaration of war. On that day, Hitler gave a speech in his apartment at the Reich Chancellery to senior Nazi Party leaders: the Reichsleiter and the Gauleiter. The following day, Joseph Goebbels, the Reich Minister of Propaganda, noted in his diary:

Christopher Browning argues that Hitler gave no order during the Reich Chancellery meeting but made clear that he had intended his 1939 warning to the Jews to be taken literally, and he signaled to party leaders that they could give appropriate orders to others. According to Gerlach, an unidentified former German Sicherheitsdienst officer wrote in a report in 1944, after defecting to Switzerland: "After America entered the war, the annihilation (Ausrottung) of all European Jews was initiated on the Führer's order."

Four days after Hitler's meeting with party leaders, Hans Frank, Governor-General of the General Government area of occupied Poland, who was at the meeting, spoke to district governors: "We must put an end to the Jews ... I will in principle proceed only on the assumption that they will disappear. They must go." On 18 December 1941, Hitler and Himmler held a meeting to which Himmler referred in his appointment book as "Juden frage | als Partisanen auszurotten" ("Jewish question / to be exterminated as partisans"). Browning interprets this as a meeting to discuss how to justify and speak about the killing.

Wannsee Conference (20 January 1942)

SS-Obergruppenführer Reinhard Heydrich, head of the Reich Security Head Office (RSHA), convened what became known as the Wannsee Conference on 20 January 1942 at Am Großen Wannsee 56–58, a villa in Berlin's Wannsee suburb. The meeting had been scheduled for 9 December 1941, and invitations had been sent between 29 November and 1 December, but on 8 December it had been postponed indefinitely, probably because of Pearl Harbor. On 8 January, Heydrich sent out notes again, this time suggesting 20 January.

The 15 men present at Wannsee included Heydrich, SS Lieutenant Colonel Adolf Eichmann, head of Reich Security Head Office Referat IV B4 ("Jewish affairs"); SS Major General Heinrich Müller, head of RSHA Department IV (the Gestapo); and other SS and party leaders. According to Browning, eight of the 15 had doctorates: "Thus it was not a dimwitted crowd unable to grasp what was going to be said to them." Thirty copies of the minutes, the Wannsee Protocol, were made. Copy no. 16 was found by American prosecutors in March 1947 in a German Foreign Office folder. Written by Eichmann and stamped "Top Secret", the minutes were written in "euphemistic language" on Heydrich's instructions, according to Eichmann's later testimony.

Discussing plans for a "final solution to the Jewish question" ("Endlösung der Judenfrage"), and a "final solution to the Jewish question in Europe" ("Endlösung der europäischen Judenfrage"), the conference was held to coordinate efforts and policies ("Parallelisierung der Linienführung"), and to ensure that authority rested with Heydrich. There was discussion about whether to include the German Mischlinge (half-Jews). Heydrich told the meeting: "Another possible solution of the problem has now taken the place of emigration, i.e. the evacuation of the Jews to the East, provided that the Fuehrer gives the appropriate approval in advance." He continued:

The evacuations were regarded as provisional ("Ausweichmöglichkeiten"). The final solution would encompass the 11million Jews living in territories controlled by Germany and elsewhere in Europe, including Britain, Ireland, Switzerland, Turkey, Sweden, Portugal, Spain, and Hungary, "dependent on military developments". According to Longerich, "the Jews were to be annihilated by a combination of forced labour and mass murder."

Extermination camps

At the end of 1941 in occupied Poland, the Germans began building additional camps or expanding existing ones. Auschwitz, for example, was expanded in October 1941 by building Auschwitz II-Birkenau a few kilometers away. By the spring or summer of 1942, gas chambers had been installed in these new facilities, except for Chełmno, which used gas vans.

Other camps sometimes described as extermination camps include Maly Trostinets near Minsk in the occupied Soviet Union, where 65,000 are thought to have been murdered, mostly by shooting but also in gas vans; Mauthausen in Austria; Stutthof, near Gdańsk, Poland; and Sachsenhausen and Ravensbrück in Germany.

Gas vans

Chełmno, with gas vans only, had its roots in the Aktion T4 euthanasia program. In December 1939 and January 1940, gas vans equipped with gas cylinders and a sealed compartment had been used to kill disabled people in occupied Poland. As the mass shootings continued in Russia, Himmler and his subordinates in the field feared that the murders were causing psychological problems for the SS, and began searching for more efficient methods. In December 1941, similar vans, using exhaust fumes rather than bottled gas, were introduced into the camp at Chełmno, Victims were asphyxiated while being driven to prepared burial pits in the nearby forests. The vans were also used in the occupied Soviet Union, for example in smaller clearing actions in the Minsk ghetto, and in Yugoslavia. Apparently, as with the mass shootings, the vans caused emotional problems for the operators, and the small number of victims the vans could handle made them ineffective.

Gas chambers

Christian Gerlach writes that over three million Jews were murdered in 1942, the year that "marked the peak" of the mass murder. At least 1.4 million of these were in the General Government area of Poland. Victims usually arrived at the extermination camps by freight train. Almost all arrivals at Bełżec, Sobibór and Treblinka were sent directly to the gas chambers, with individuals occasionally selected to replace dead workers. At Auschwitz, about 20 percent of Jews were selected to work. Those selected for death at all camps were told to undress and hand their valuables to camp workers. They were then herded naked into the gas chambers. To prevent panic, they were told the gas chambers were showers or delousing chambers.

At Auschwitz, after the chambers were filled, the doors were shut and pellets of Zyklon-B were dropped into the chambers through vents, releasing toxic prussic acid. Those inside were murdered within 20 minutes; the speed of death depended on how close the inmate was standing to a gas vent, according to the commandant Rudolf Höss, who estimated that about one-third of the victims were killed immediately. Johann Kremer, an SS doctor who oversaw the gassings, testified that: "Shouting and screaming of the victims could be heard through the opening and it was clear that they fought for their lives." The gas was then pumped out, and the Sonderkommando—work groups of mostly Jewish prisoners—carried out the bodies, extracted gold fillings, cut off women's hair, and removed jewelry, artificial limbs and glasses. At Auschwitz, the bodies were at first buried in deep pits and covered with lime, but between September and November 1942, on the orders of Himmler, 100,000 bodies were dug up and burned. In early 1943, new gas chambers and crematoria were built to accommodate the numbers.

Bełżec, Sobibór and Treblinka became known as the Operation Reinhard camps, named after the German plan to murder the Jews in the General Government area of occupied Poland. Between March 1942 and November 1943, around 1,526,500 Jews were murdered in these three camps in gas chambers using carbon monoxide from the exhaust fumes of stationary diesel engines. Gold fillings were pulled from the corpses before burial, but unlike in Auschwitz the women's hair was cut before death. At Treblinka, to calm the victims, the arrival platform was made to look like a train station, complete with a fake clock. Most of the victims at these three camps were buried in pits at first. From mid-1942, as part of Sonderaktion 1005, prisoners at Auschwitz, Chelmno, Bełżec, Sobibór, and Treblinka were forced to exhume and burn bodies that had been buried, in part to hide the evidence, and in part because of the terrible smell pervading the camps and a fear that the drinking water would become polluted. The corpses—700,000 in Treblinka—were burned on wood in open fire pits and the remaining bones crushed into powder.

Collaboration

Although the Holocaust was planned and directed by Germans, the Nazi regime found willing collaborators in other countries (e.g. the Ustashe of Croatia), or forced others into participation. This included individual collaboration as well as state collaboration. According to Dan Stone the Holocaust was a pan-European phenomenon, a series of "Holocausts" impossible to conduct without local collaborators and Germany's allies. Stone writes that "many European states, under the extreme circumstances of World War II, took upon themselves the task of solving the 'Jewish question' in their own way."

Resistance

Jewish resistance

There was almost no resistance in the ghettos in Poland until the end of 1942. Raul Hilberg accounted for this by evoking the history of Jewish persecution: compliance might avoid inflaming the situation until the onslaught abated. Timothy Snyder noted that it was only during the three months after the deportations of July–September 1942 that agreement on the need for armed resistance was reached.

Several resistance groups were formed, such as the Jewish Combat Organization (ŻOB) and Jewish Military Union (ŻZW) in the Warsaw Ghetto and the United Partisan Organization in Vilna. Over 100 revolts and uprisings occurred in at least 19 ghettos and elsewhere in Eastern Europe. The best known is the Warsaw Ghetto Uprising in April 1943, when the Germans arrived to send the remaining inhabitants to extermination camps. Forced to retreat on 19 April from the ŻOB and ŻZW fighters, they returned later that day under the command of SS General Jürgen Stroop (author of the Stroop Report about the uprising). Around 1,000 poorly armed fighters held the SS at bay for four weeks. Polish and Jewish accounts stated that hundreds or thousands of Germans had been killed, while the Germans reported 16 dead. The Germans said that 14,000 Jews had been killed—7000 during the fighting and 7000 sent to Treblinka—and between 53,000 and 56,000 deported. According to Gwardia Ludowa, a Polish resistance newspaper, in May 1943:

During a revolt in Treblinka on 2 August 1943, inmates killed five or six guards and set fire to camp buildings; several managed to escape. In the Białystok Ghetto on 16 August, Jewish insurgents fought for five days when the Germans announced mass deportations. On 14 October, Jewish prisoners in Sobibór attempted an escape, killing 11 SS officers, as well as two or three Ukrainian and Volksdeutsche guards. According to Yitzhak Arad, this was the highest number of SS officers killed in a single revolt. Around 300 inmates escaped (out of 600 in the main camp), but 100 were recaptured and shot. On 7 October 1944, 300 Jewish members, mostly Greek or Hungarian, of the Sonderkommando at Auschwitz learned they were about to be killed, and staged an uprising, blowing up crematorium IV. Three SS officers were killed. The Sonderkommando at crematorium II threw their Oberkapo into an oven when they heard the commotion, believing that a camp uprising had begun. By the time the SS had regained control, 451 members of the Sonderkommando were dead; 212 survived.

Estimates of Jewish participation in partisan units throughout Europe range from 20,000 to 100,000. In the occupied Polish and Soviet territories, thousands of Jews fled into the swamps or forests and joined the partisans, although the partisan movements did not always welcome them. An estimated 20,000 to 30,000 joined the Soviet partisan movement. One of the famous Jewish groups was the Bielski partisans in Belarus, led by the Bielski brothers. Jews also joined Polish forces, including the Home Army. According to Timothy Snyder, "more Jews fought in the Warsaw Uprising of August 1944 than in the Warsaw Ghetto Uprising of April 1943."

Polish resistance and flow of information

The Polish government-in-exile in London received information about the extermination camp at Auschwitz from the Polish leadership in Warsaw from 1940 onwards, and by August 1942 there was "a continual flow of information to and from Poland", according to Michael Fleming. This was in large measure thanks to Captain Witold Pilecki of the Polish Home Army, who was sent to the camp in September 1940 after allowing himself to be arrested in Warsaw. An inmate until he escaped in April 1943, his mission was to set up a resistance movement (ZOW), prepare to take over the camp, and smuggle out information.

On 6 January 1942, the Soviet Minister of Foreign Affairs, Vyacheslav Molotov, sent out diplomatic notes about German atrocities, based on reports about mass graves and bodies surfacing in areas the Red Army had liberated, as well as witness reports from German-occupied areas. According to Fleming, in May and June 1942, London was told about the extermination camps at Chełmno, Sobibór, and Bełzėc. Szlama Ber Winer escaped from Chełmno in February and passed information to the Oneg Shabbat group in the Warsaw Ghetto; his report was known by his pseudonym as the Grojanowski Report. Also in 1942, Jan Karski sent information to the Allies after being smuggled into the Warsaw Ghetto twice. By c. July 1942, Polish leaders in Warsaw had learned about the mass killing of Jews in Auschwitz. The Polish Interior Ministry prepared a report, Sprawozdanie 6/42, which said at the end:

Sprawozdanie 6/42 had reached London by 12 November 1942, where it was translated into English to become part of a 108-page report, "Report on Conditions in Poland", on which the date 27 November 1942 was handwritten. This report was sent to the Polish Embassy in Washington, D.C. On 10 December 1942, the Polish Foreign Affairs Minister, Edward Raczyński, addressed the fledgling United Nations on the killings; the address was distributed with the title The Mass Extermination of Jews in German Occupied Poland. He told them about the use of poison gas; about Treblinka, Bełżec and Sobibór; that the Polish underground had referred to them as extermination camps; and that tens of thousands of Jews had been killed in Bełżec in March and April 1942. One in three Jews in Poland were already dead, he estimated, from a population of 3,130,000. Raczyński's address was covered by the New York Times and The Times of London. Winston Churchill received it, and Anthony Eden presented it to the British cabinet. On 17 December 1942, 11 Allies issued the Joint Declaration by Members of the United Nations condemning the "bestial policy of cold-blooded extermination".

The British and American governments were reluctant to publicize the intelligence they had received. A BBC Hungarian Service memo, written by Carlile Macartney, said in 1942: "We shouldn't mention the Jews at all." The British government's view was that the Hungarian people's antisemitism would make them distrust the Allies if Allied broadcasts focused on the Jews. In the United States, where antisemitism and isolationism were common, the government similarly feared turning the war into one about the Jews. Although governments and the German public appear to have understood what was happening to the Jews, it seems the Jews themselves did not. According to Saul Friedländer, "[t]estimonies left by Jews from all over occupied Europe indicate that, in contradistinction to vast segments of surrounding society, the victims did not understand what was ultimately in store for them." In Western Europe, he writes, Jewish communities failed to piece the information together, while in Eastern Europe they could not accept that the stories they had heard from elsewhere would end up applying to them too.

End of the war

The Holocaust in Hungary

By 1943 it was evident to the leadership of the armed forces that Germany was losing the war. Rail shipments of Jews were still arriving regularly from western and southern Europe at the extermination camps. Shipments of Jews had priority on the German railways over anything but the army's needs, and continued even in the face of the increasingly dire military situation at the end of 1942. Army leaders and economic managers complained about this diversion of resources and the killing of skilled Jewish workers, but Nazi leaders rated ideological imperatives above economic considerations.

The mass murder reached a "frenetic" pace in 1944 when Auschwitz gassed nearly 500,000 people. On 19 March 1944, Hitler ordered the military occupation of Hungary and dispatched Adolf Eichmann to supervise the deportation of its Jews. Between 15 May and 9 July, 440,000 Jews were deported from Hungary to Auschwitz II-Birkenau, almost all sent directly to the gas chambers. A month before the deportations began, Eichmann offered through an intermediary, Joel Brand, to exchange one million Jews for 10,000 trucks from the Allies, which the Germans would agree not to use on the Western front. The British thwarted the proposal by leaking it. The Times called it "a new level of fantasy and self-deception". Publication of the Vrba–Wetzler report halted Hungarian government cooperation with Jewish deportations for several months and sparked international interventions that saved tens of thousands of lives.

Death marches

As the Soviet armed forces advanced, the SS closed down the camps in eastern Poland and tried to conceal what had happened. The gas chambers were dismantled, the crematoria dynamited, and the mass graves dug up and corpses cremated. From January to April 1945, the SS sent inmates westward on death marches to camps in Germany and Austria. In January 1945, the Germans held records of 714,000 inmates in concentration camps; by May, 250,000 (35 percent) had died during these marches. Already sick after exposure to violence and starvation, they were marched to train stations and transported for days without food or shelter in open freight cars, then forced to march again at the other end to the new camp. Some went by truck or wagons; others were marched the entire distance. Those who lagged behind or fell were shot.

Liberation

The first major camp encountered by Allied troops, Majdanek, was discovered by the advancing Soviets, along with its gas chambers, on 25 July 1944. Treblinka, Sobibór, and Bełżec were never liberated, but were destroyed by the Germans in 1943. On 17 January 1945, 58,000 Auschwitz inmates were sent on a death march westwards; when the camp was liberated by the Soviets on 27 January, they found just 7,000 inmates in the three main camps and 500 in subcamps. Buchenwald was liberated by the Americans on 11 April; Bergen-Belsen by the British on 15 April; Dachau by the Americans on 29 April; Ravensbrück by the Soviets on 30 April; and Mauthausen by the Americans on 5 May. The Red Cross took control of Theresienstadt on 3 May, days before the Soviets arrived. The British 11th Armoured Division found around 60,000 prisoners (90 percent Jews) when they liberated Bergen-Belsen, as well as 13,000 unburied corpses; another 10,000 people died from typhus or malnutrition over the following weeks.

Death toll

The Jews killed represented around one third of world Jewry and about two-thirds of European Jewry, based on a pre-war figure of 9.7 million Jews in Europe. Most heavily concentrated in the east, the pre-war Jewish population in Europe was 3.5 million in Poland; 3 million in the Soviet Union; nearly 800,000 in Romania, and 700,000 in Hungary. Germany had over 500,000. The death camps in occupied Poland accounted for half the Jews murdered. At Auschwitz, the number of Jewish victims was 960,000; Treblinka 870,000; Bełżec 600,000; Chełmno 320,000; Sobibór 250,000; and Majdanek 79,000. The most commonly cited death toll is the six million given by Adolf Eichmann to SS member Wilhelm Höttl, who signed an affidavit mentioning this figure in 1945. Historians' estimates range from 4,204,000 to 7,000,000. According to Yad Vashem, "[a]ll the serious research" confirms that between five and six million Jews were murdered.

Death rates were heavily dependent on the survival of European states willing to protect their Jewish citizens. In countries allied to Germany, the state's control over its citizens, including the Jews, was seen as a matter of sovereignty. The continuous presence of state institutions thereby prevented the Jewish communities' complete destruction. In occupied countries, the survival of the state was likewise correlated with lower Jewish death rates: 75 percent of Jews survived in France and 99 percent in Denmark, but 75 percent died in the Netherlands, as did 99 percent of Jews who were in Estonia when the Germans arrived—the Nazis declared Estonia Judenfrei ("free of Jews") in January 1942 at the Wannsee Conference.

The survival of Jews in countries where states were not destroyed demonstrates the "crucial" influence of non-Germans (governments and others), according to Christian Gerlach. Jews who lived where pre-war statehood was destroyed (Poland and the Baltic states) or displaced (western USSR) were at the mercy of sometimes-hostile local populations, in addition to the Germans. Almost all Jews in German-occupied Poland, the Baltic states and the USSR were murdered, with a 5 percent chance of survival on average. Of Poland's 3.3 million Jews, about 90 percent were murdered.

Other victims of Nazi persecution

Soviet civilians and POWs

The Nazis regarded the Slavs as Untermenschen (non-Aryan inferior people). German troops destroyed villages throughout the Soviet Union, rounded up civilians for forced labor in Germany, and caused famine by taking foodstuffs. In Belarus, Germany imposed a regime that deported 380,000 people for slave labor, murdered 1.6 million, and destroyed at least 5,295 settlements. The United States Holocaust Memorial Museum estimates that 3.3 million of 5.7 million Soviet POWs died in German custody. The death rates decreased when the POWs were needed to help the German war effort; by 1943, half a million had been deployed as slave labor.

A 1995 paper published by M. V. Filimoshin, an associate of the Russian Defense Ministry, put the civilian death toll in the regions occupied by Germany at 13.7 million. Filimoshin cited sources from the Soviet era to support his figures and used the terms "genocide" and "premeditated extermination" when referring to deaths of 7.4 million civilians caused by direct, intentional violence. Civilians killed in reprisals during the Soviet partisan war account for a major portion. Filimoshin estimated that civilian forced laborer deaths in Germany totaled 2.1 million. Germany had a policy of forced confiscation of food that resulted in famine deaths of an estimated 6% of the population, or 4.1 million. Russian government sources currently cite these civilian casualty figures in their official statements.

Ethnic Poles

From the start of the war against Poland, Germany intended to realize Adolf Hitler's plan, set out in his book Mein Kampf, to acquire "living space" (Lebensraum) in the east for massive settlement of German colonists. Hitler's plan combined classic imperialism with Nazi racial ideology. While the long-term goal of Nazi Germany was removal of Jews from occupied Poland, in the initial months of occupation the SS predominantly directed physical violence towards ethnic Poles, arresting and executing educated elites in an attempt to prevent the development of organized resistance.

On 7 September 1939, Reinhard Heydrich stated that all Polish nobles, clergy, and Jews were to be murdered. On 12 September, Wilhelm Keitel added Poland's intelligentsia to the list. On 15 March 1940, SS chief Heinrich Himmler stated: "All Polish specialists will be exploited in our military-industrial complex. Later, all Poles will disappear from this world. It is imperative that the great German nation consider the elimination of all Polish people as its chief task." At the end of 1940, Hitler confirmed the plan to liquidate "all leading elements in Poland". After Germany lost the war, the International Military Tribunal at the Nuremberg Trials and Poland's Supreme National Tribunal concluded that the aim of German policies in Polandthe extermination of Poles and Jewswas a genocide in biological terms. An estimated 1.8–1.9 million non-Jewish Polish citizens were killed by Germans during the war. At least 200,000 died in concentration camps, around 146,000 in Auschwitz. Others died in massacres or in revolts such as the Warsaw Uprising, where 150,000–200,000 were killed.

Roma

Historians estimate that Germany and its allies killed between 250,000 and 500,000 Roma, around 25–50 percent of the community in Europe. Research cited by Ian Hancock suggests the pre-war Romani population of Europe may have been much higher, resulting in estimates of up to 1.5 million Roma deaths. Unlike Jews, who were predominantly transported to and murdered in mass extermination camps, Romanies outside the Reich were mostly massacred in smaller groups of several hundred or less, in many different places; together with the exclusion of Romanies from most contemporary European censuses, this makes it impossible for historians to determine the precise number of Romani victims in Poland, Yugoslavia, White Ruthenia and Ukraine, the regions in which most are thought to have been killed.

Robert Ritter, head of Germany's Racial Hygiene and Demographic Biology Research Unit, called Roma "a peculiar form of the human species who are incapable of development and came about by mutation". In May 1942, they were placed under similar laws to the Jews, and in December Himmler ordered that they be sent to Auschwitz, unless they had served in the Wehrmacht. He adjusted the order on 15 November 1943 to allow "sedentary Gypsies and part-Gypsies" in the occupied Soviet areas to be viewed as citizens. In Belgium, France, and the Netherlands, the Roma were subject to restrictions on movement and confinement to collection camps, while in Eastern Europe they were sent to concentration camps, where large numbers were murdered.

Political and religious opponents

German communists, socialists and trade unionists were among the first to be sent to concentration camps. Nacht und Nebel ("Night and Fog"), a directive issued by Hitler on 7 December 1941, resulted in the disappearance, torture and death of political activists throughout German-occupied Europe; the courts had sentenced 1,793 people to death by April 1944, according to Jack Fischel. Because they refused to pledge allegiance to the Nazi party or serve in the military, Jehovah's Witnesses were sent to concentration camps, where they were given the option of renouncing their faith and submitting to the state's authority. Between 2,700 and 3,300 were sent to the camps, where 1,400 died. According to German historian Detlef Garbe, "no other religious movement resisted the pressure to conform to National Socialism with comparable unanimity and steadfastness."

Homosexuals

Around 100,000 gay men were arrested in Germany and 50,000 jailed between 1933 and 1945; 5,000–15,000 are thought to have been sent to concentration camps. Hundreds were castrated, sometimes "voluntarily" to avoid criminal sentences. In 1936, Himmler created the Reich Central Office for the Combating of Homosexuality and Abortion. The police closed gay bars and shut down gay publications.

Lesbians were left relatively unaffected; the Nazis saw them as "asocials", rather than sexual deviants. However, where sexuality intersected with other identities, lesbianism could be used as an additional reason for persecution. In some concentration camps brothels were established to punish lesbian women by raping them. Sex with Jewish women was forbidden on grounds of racial disgrace by the Nazis, but rape was not considered a racial disgrace in concentration camps.

Afro-Germans 

There were 5,000–25,000 Afro-Germans in Germany when the Nazis came to power. Although blacks in Germany and German-occupied Europe were subjected to incarceration, sterilization and murder, there was no program to kill them as a group.

Aftermath and legacy

Trials

During the International Military Tribunal, 21 Nazi leaders were tried, primarily for waging wars of aggression, but the trial also exposed the systematic murder of European Jews. Twelve additional trials before American courts from 1946 to 1949 tried another 177 defendants; in these trials, the Holocaust took center stage. These trials were ineffective in their goal of re-educating Germans; by 1948, only 30 percent of Germans believed Nazism was a bad idea. A consensus in West German society demanded amnesty and release of the convicted prisoners. West Germany initially tried few ex-Nazis, but after the 1958 Ulm Einsatzkommando trial, the government set up a dedicated agency. Other trials of Nazis and collaborators took place in Western and Eastern Europe. In 1960 Mossad agents captured Adolf Eichmann in Argentina and brought him to Israel to stand trial on 15 charges of war crimes, crimes against humanity, and crimes against the Jewish people. He was convicted in December 1961 and executed in June 1962. Eichmann's trial revived interest in war criminals and the Holocaust in general.

Reparations

The government of Israel requested $1.5 billion from the Federal Republic of Germany in March 1951 to finance the rehabilitation of 500,000 Jewish survivors, arguing that Germany had stolen $6 billion from the European Jews. Israelis were divided about the idea of taking money from Germany.

West Germany allocated another $125 million for reparations in 1988. Companies such as BMW, Deutsche Bank, Ford, Opel, Siemens, and Volkswagen faced lawsuits for their use of forced labor during the war. In response, Germany set up the "Remembrance, Responsibility and Future" Foundation in 2000, which paid €4.45 billion to former slave laborers (up to €7,670 each). In 2013 Germany agreed to provide €772 million to fund nursing care, social services, and medication for 56,000 Holocaust survivors around the world. The French state-owned railway company, the SNCF, agreed in 2014 to pay $60 million to Jewish-American survivors, around $100,000 each, for its role in the transport of 76,000 Jews from France to extermination camps between 1942 and 1944.

Remembrance and historiography

The tendency to see the Holocaust as a unique event was influential in early Holocaust scholarship, but came under contestation, and eventually mainstream Holocaust scholarship came to reject explicit claims of uniqueness, while recognizing differences between the Holocaust and other genocides. In popular culture, Hitler is a hegemonic historical analogy for evil and Nazi comparisons are common. Yom HaShoah became Israel's Holocaust Remembrance Day in 1951. At least 37 countries and the United Nations have similar observances.

See also 
 Hunger Plan

Explanatory notes

References

Citations

Works cited

 
 
 
 
 
-->
 
 
 
 
 
 
 
 
 
 
 
 
 
 
 
 
 
 
 
 
 
 

 
 
 
 
 

 
 

 
 
 
 
 
 

 
 
 
 
 
 
 
 
 
 
 
 
 
 
 

 
 
 
 
 
 
 
 
 
 
 
 
 
 

 
 
 
 
 
 
 
 
 
 -->

 

 
 
 
 Knowlton, James and Cates, Truett (translators, 1993). 
 
 
 -->

External links

 Global Directory of Holocaust Museums.
 H-Holocaust, H-Net discussion list for librarians, scholars and advanced students.
 "Auschwitz: Drone video of Nazi concentration camp". BBC News, 27 January 2015.
 

 
1940s in Europe
Anti-black racism in Europe
Anti-communism
Anti-Masonry
Anti-Polish sentiment in Europe
Anti-Russian sentiment
Antisemitic attacks and incidents
Ethnic cleansing in Europe
Genocides in Europe
History of the Jews in Europe
History of the Romani people during World War II
Homophobia
Mass murder in 1941
Mass murder in 1942
Mass murder in 1943
Mass murder in 1944
Mass murder in 1945
Nazi war crimes
Persecution of Jehovah's Witnesses
Vichy France